Cove Creek is an unincorporated community and census-designated place in Watauga County, North Carolina, United States. Its population was 1,171 as of the 2010 census.

Geography

Demographics

References

Unincorporated communities in Watauga County, North Carolina
Unincorporated communities in North Carolina
Census-designated places in Watauga County, North Carolina
Census-designated places in North Carolina